Hōkyō-ji (宝慶寺) is a Sōtō Zen Buddhist temple founded about 1278 in Echizen, Fukui prefecture, Japan.

History and founding
Jakuen left Eihei-ji in 1261. By one account, a leader of the Fujiwara clan in charge of the Ono District, Ijira Tomotoshi happened to find him during a hunt, and offered his financial support. In 1278, Tomotoshi's son Tomanari built a temple for Jakuen who apparently wished to revere Ju-ching by taking the name from the Hōkyō era in China, a period during which  Ju-ching was Dogen's teacher.

Giun, who was Jakuen's student and eventual Dharma heir, joined Hōkyō-ji in 1279, where he succeeded Jakuen as the abbot in 1299 for 15 years. Later Giun went to Eihei-ji for 18 years.

Keizan joined in 1282, when he became ino. Studying with Jakuen, Keizan experienced enlightenment at Hōkyō-ji in 1285.

From the Hōkyō-ji treasure house

Notes

Bibliography

Religious organizations established in the 1270s
Soto temples
Buddhist temples in Fukui Prefecture